Abraxas pusilla is a species of moth belonging to the family Geometridae. It was described by Arthur Gardiner Butler in 1880. It is known from Darjeeling in India.

References

Abraxini
Moths of Asia
Moths described in 1880